The 2002 Amstel Gold Race was the 37th edition of the annual road bicycle race "Amstel Gold Race", held on Sunday April 28, 2002 in the Limburg province, The Netherlands. The race stretched 254.4 kilometres, with the start and finish in Maastricht. There were a total of 195 competitors, with 98 of them finishing the race.

Result

External links
Results

Amstel Gold Race
2002 in Dutch sport
2002 in road cycling
Amstel Gold Race
April 2002 sports events in Europe